Nathaniel Burwell Harvey House was a historic home located near Dublin, Pulaski County, Virginia. It was built in 1909–1910, and was a -story, three bay, Colonial Revival style brick dwelling on a limestone basement. It had a rear brick ell and hipped roof with dormers. The front facade featured a one-story porch with six Tuscan order columns.  The interior had decorative stenciling by artist James D. Chapman.

It was added to the National Register of Historic Places in 1986; it was delisted in 2001.

References

Former National Register of Historic Places in Virginia
Houses on the National Register of Historic Places in Virginia
Houses completed in 1910
Colonial Revival architecture in Virginia
Houses in Pulaski County, Virginia
National Register of Historic Places in Pulaski County, Virginia